Uinta County School District #6 is a public school district based in Lyman, Wyoming, United States.

Geography
Uinta County School District #6 serves northeastern Uinta County. The town of Lyman is the only incorporated place in the district.

Schools
Lyman High School (Grades 9–12)
Lyman Intermediate School (Grades 5–8)
Urie Elementary School (Grades K-4)

Student demographics
The following figures are as of October 1, 2008.

Total District Enrollment: 672
Student enrollment by gender
Male: 332 (49.40%)
Female: 340 (50.60%)
Student enrollment by ethnicity
White (not Hispanic): 634 (94.35%)
Hispanic: 24 (3.57%)
Black (not Hispanic): 6 (0.89%)
Asian or Pacific Islander: 5 (0.74%)
American Indian or Alaskan Native: 3 (0.45%)

See also
List of school districts in Wyoming

References

External links
Uinta County School District #6 – official site.

Education in Uinta County, Wyoming
School districts in Wyoming